Anthony Miller may refer to:

Anthony Miller (basketball) (born 1971), basketball player
Anthony Miller (wide receiver, born 1965), American football wide receiver
Anthony Miller (wide receiver, born 1994), American football wide receiver
Anthony Miller (murderer) (1941–1960)
Anthony Miller (Australia), owner of the Big Rocking Horse, Australia
Anthony W. Miller, former US Deputy Secretary of Education

See also
Tony Miller (disambiguation)
Anthony Millar, Irish politician